Rashtriya Ulama Council (RUC') is a political party of India formed in 2008.

History
RUC came into existence on 4 October 2008 and was originally called the Ulama Council. It began as a protest group after two youths from Azamgarh were killed in the Batla House near the area of Jamia Nagar, New Delhi. after which a witch hunt of educated Muslim youths from eastern UP took place and the people of Azamgarh irrespective of their religion had to face discrimination and hatred in the name of Azamgarh It was the initiative of Maulana Aamir Rashadi Madni, who came forward and called a meeting of the intellectuals and clerics of Uttar Pradesh, in particular region of Azamgarh and nearby districts on 4 October 2008.

The Ulama Council booked a train on 29 January 2009 and took thousands of citizens from Azamgarh, Jaunpur, Faizabad, Lucknow, Aligarh, Bijnour, Delhi to protest against the central government and asked for a judicial probe of the encounter. On 20 February 2009, RUC booked two trains and took thousands to convey their protest against the state government. After that they booked 2 trains and took thousands of protesters to Lucknow and demanded justice, but when no response was given to their demands they group decided to participate in elections and play active role in electoral democracy. The Ulama Council became a mass movement and transformed into the Rashtriya Ulama Council, a full-fledged political party. The party is pursuing the Batla House case through both protests and legal means. According to Aamir Rashadi Madni,

2009 Parliamentary Elections
RUC participated in the 2009 parliamentary elections on 5 seats and as expected RUC didn't win any seat but they secured approximately 2.25 lakh (225,000) votes, unusually successful for a party that was only five months old. It did not ally with other parties.

2012 UP Assembly Election
RUC participated in the Uttar Pradesh 2012 Assembly election, contesting 100 seats out of 401. As expected, the RUC did not win any seats, but they secured nearly 6 lakh (600,000) votes.

2014 Parliamentary Elections
RUC participated in the 2014 elections on a very few seats only citing the reason that they want to stop the fascist forces from coming in to power. The national president of the party Maulana Aamir Rashadi contested election against SP Supremo Mulayam Singh Yadav from Azamgarh and this created a lot of headlines.

2017 UP Assembly Elections
RUC had declared 84 candidates but just before 1 month from the elections in a shocking turn of events RUC decided to support BSP to keep away SP and BJP from power and supported the BSP candidates in the elections on rest of the seats.

2022 UP Assembly Elections
The Peace Party of India and the Rashtriya Ulama Council (RUC) on announced they would contest the 2022 Uttar Pradesh Assembly elections together under the banner of United Democratic Alliance.

References

External links
Official Facebook Page
Official Twitter Page

Political parties of minorities
Islamic political parties in India